"My Heart Belongs to You" is a 1948 song by Arbee Stidham.  The single spent six months on the US Billboard R&B chart, reaching the number one position for one week.  "My Heart Belongs to You" was Stidham's only hit on the chart.

References

1948 songs
1948 singles